Rosemary S. Pooler (born June 21, 1938) is a senior United States circuit judge of the United States Court of Appeals for the Second Circuit.

Early life
Pooler was born in New York City, New York. She earned a Bachelor of Arts degree from Brooklyn College in 1959, a Master of Arts from the University of Connecticut, and a Juris Doctor from the University of Michigan Law School. She also attended the Program for Senior Managers in Government of Harvard University in 1978, and earned a Graduate Certificate in Regulatory Economics from the State University of New York, Albany in 1978.

Early career
Following graduation from law school, Pooler entered private law practice in Syracuse, New York. In 1972, she was appointed as Director of the Consumer Affairs Unit in the Syracuse Corporation Counsel's Office, serving in that post for a year. From 1974 to 1975, she served on the Syracuse City Council. In 1975, she was appointed as Chairman of the New York State Consumer Protection Board, serving until 1980. The following year, she was appointed to the state Public Service Commission. In 1987, she served as a committee staff member for the New York State Assembly. Following a stint on the faculty at Syracuse University College of Law, she served as Vice President of Legal Affairs at the Atlantic States Legal Foundation from 1989 to 1990.

Congressional campaigns
In 1986, Pooler decided to run for the United States House of Representatives in New York's 27th congressional district. She challenged conservative Republican incumbent George C. Wortley, who was seeking a fourth term. She campaigned aggressively and came within less than 1,000 votes of winning. In 1988, Wortley decided not to seek reelection. Pooler was considered a leading prospect of a Democratic gain. But her Republican opponent that year, Syracuse City Councilman James T. Walsh, was a much more difficult target for her attacks. Walsh won handily, with Pooler winning only 42% of the vote.

Judicial career

Supreme Court of New York
In 1990, she was elected as a Justice for the Fifth Judicial District of the Supreme Court of New York.

Federal judicial service

District court service
Pooler was nominated by President Bill Clinton on April 26, 1994, to a seat on the United States District Court for the Northern District of New York vacated by Judge Howard G. Munson. She was confirmed by the Senate on August 9, 1994, and received commission on August 10, 1994. Her service terminated on June 9, 1998 when she was elevated to the Second Circuit Court.

Court of appeals service
Pooler was nominated by President Clinton on November 6, 1997, to a seat on the United States Court of Appeals for the Second Circuit vacated by Frank Altimari. She was confirmed by the Senate on June 2, 1998, and received commission on June 3, 1998. Pooler announced she would assume senior status upon the confirmation of her successor. She assumed senior status on March 23, 2022.

Notable dissent

Pooler dissented in the 2009 ruling Arar v. Ashcroft, a case in which Maher Arar, a Canadian citizen, had been sent to Syria and was tortured there. While the majority found that there was no remedy for Arar, Pooler and three other judges would have granted Arar the declaratory judgment he was seeking. All four dissenters wrote their own dissenting opinion.

In August 2017, Pooler dissented when the court upheld the insider trading conviction of Mathew Martoma, in which she argued that the majority was improperly overruling circuit precedent.  In June 2018, the majority issued an amended opinion reaching the same result, again over the dissent of Pooler.

In a August 2021 case regarding a unwarranted police search of a Black man, Pooler was one of three dissenters who argued that the search violates the 4th Amendment (the other 2 dissenters were Guido Calabresi and Denny Chin). Pooler noted that "The victims of police officers’ whims   are disproportionately people of color. Black drivers are more likely to be pulled over by police officers than white drivers, and police officers search stopped black and Latino drivers twice as often as stopped white drivers, despite data suggesting searches of these black and Latino drivers are less likely to discover guns, drugs, or other illegal contraband."

See also
List of Jewish American jurists
Ricci v. DeStefano

References

External links

1938 births
Living people
20th-century American judges
20th-century American women judges
21st-century American women judges
21st-century American judges
Brooklyn College alumni
Judges of the United States Court of Appeals for the Second Circuit
Judges of the United States District Court for the Northern District of New York
Lawyers from New York City
Lawyers from Syracuse, New York
New York Supreme Court Justices
United States court of appeals judges appointed by Bill Clinton
United States district court judges appointed by Bill Clinton
University of Connecticut alumni
University of Michigan Law School alumni